Paulo César Dworakowski (born 12 September 1956) is a Brazilian rower. He competed in the men's single sculls event at the 1980 Summer Olympics.

References

1956 births
Living people
Brazilian male rowers
Olympic rowers of Brazil
Rowers at the 1980 Summer Olympics
Rowers from Rio de Janeiro (city)
Pan American Games medalists in rowing
Pan American Games silver medalists for Brazil
Rowers at the 1979 Pan American Games